The 2006 UCI ProTour was the second year of the UCI ProTour system, in which the ProTour teams are guaranteed, and obliged to, participate in the series of ProTour races.

The prelude to the 2006 ProTour was dominated by a dispute between the managers of the Grand Tours and UCI, which meant that the Grand Tours were initially not to be a part of the 2006 ProTour. On April 7, 2006, an agreement to the dispute between the Grand Tours organisers and the Union Cycliste Internationale was reached , guaranteeing the future of the ProTour.

2006 ProTour races

Final individual standings 

 A total of 209 riders were classified
 Floyd Landis had 175 points before the UCI removed his name from the standings following his removal from the Phonak team.

Final team standings

Final nation standings 

 Riders from 29 nations scored at least one UCI ProTour point.

2006 ProTour Points System 

 If a rider is not part of UCI ProTour, no points are given. The points corresponding to the place are not awarded
 Top 20 teams get points in scale 20-19-18...-1.
 Team time trial doesn't give points for riders.
 In country ranking, top 5 riders of each country count towards the ranking.

External links
 Official Website
 CSC Web site  source of preliminary race table.

 
2006 in road cycling
2006